Providence Chapel can refer to:
Providence Chapel, Black Country Living Museum
Providence Chapel, Charlwood, former Nonconformist place of worship.
Providence Chapel, Hadlow Down, former Calvinistic Baptist place of worship.